The Riveras is an American reality television series that premiered on Universo on October 16, 2016. The series follows the five children of late Mexican-American singer Jenni Rivera as they begin to pursue their dreams and continue to honor Rivera's legacy.

On May 9, 2019, Telemundo announced that the series has been renewed for a fourth season that premiered on August 11, 2019.

Series overview

Episodes

Season 1 (2016)

Season 2 (2017)

Special (2017)

Season 3 (2018)

Season 4 (2019)

References 

Lists of American non-fiction television series episodes
Lists of reality television series episodes